Qaleh-ye Darab Khan (also Romanized as Qal‘eh-ye Dārāb Khān) is a village in Chaqa Narges Rural District, Mahidasht District, Kermanshah County, Kermanshah Province, Iran. At the 2006 census, its population was 541, in 119 families.

References 

Populated places in Kermanshah County